Malley is a surname. It may refer to:

People
Alex Malley, former chief executive of CPA Australia
Bill Malley, American production designer and art director
Bill Malley (golfer) (born 1952), American professional golfer
Connor Malley (born 2000), English professional footballer
Garnet Malley (1892–1961), World War I flying ace credited with six aerial victories
Gemma Malley, author of The Declaration (novel)
George Malley (American football) (1903–1979), American football coach
George Malley (athlete) (born 1955), American steeplechase and long-distance runner
Keith Malley, American stand-up comedian and podcaster, founded the Keith and The Girl podcast
Michael Malley (born 1962), former politician in the Canadian Province of New Brunswick
Pat Malley (died 1985), American college football coach
Phil Malley (born 1965), retired English professional footballer
Robert Malley (born 1963), American lawyer, political scientist, specialist in conflict resolution
Simon Malley (1923–2006), prominent francophone journalist, supporter of Third World independence movements
Terry Malley (born 1954), American football coach
William C. Malley (1868–1908), American football player and coach

Fictitious characters
Ern Malley, fictitious poet, the central figure in Australia's most celebrated literary hoax

See also
Malley Fitness Center, at Santa Clara University
CIG de Malley, Indoor arena in Lausanne, Switzerland
ES FC Malley, football club from Malley, Switzerland
Maley, a surname
Mally (disambiguation)
Maly (disambiguation)
Mallie (disambiguation)
O'Malley (disambiguation)